Lars Flüggen (born 24 May 1990) is a German Olympic volleyball player. He competed at the 2016 Summer Olympics in men's beach volleyball with partner Markus Bröckermann.

References 

German men's beach volleyball players
Olympic beach volleyball players of Germany
Beach volleyball players at the 2016 Summer Olympics
1990 births
Living people
21st-century German people